= French election, 2017 =

French election, 2017 may refer to:

- 2017 French presidential election
- 2017 French legislative election
